In and Out of the Garden: Madison Square Garden '81, '82, '83 is a live album by the rock band the Grateful Dead.  Packaged as a box set, it contains six complete concerts on 17 CDs.  It was recorded at Madison Square Garden in New York City in 1981, 1982, and 1983.  It was released on September 23, 2022, in a limited edition of 12,500 numbered copies.

The March 9, 1981 concert included in In and Out of the Garden was also released on September 23, 2022 as a three-CD album called Madison Square Garden, New York, NY 3/9/81.

The title of the box set is taken from the opening verse of the song "St. Stephen", from their album Aoxomoxoa and performed during the 10/11/83 show.

In and Out of the Garden won a Grammy award for Best Boxed or Special Limited Edition Package.  It was the Grateful Dead's second Grammy, following their 2007 Lifetime Achievement Award.

Track listing

March 9, 1981 
Disc 1
First set:
"Feel Like a Stranger" (Bob Weir, John Perry Barlow)
"Althea" (Jerry Garcia, Robert Hunter)
"C.C. Rider" (traditional, arranged by Grateful Dead)
"Ramble On Rose" (Garcia, Hunter) →
"El Paso" (Marty Robbins)
"Deep Elem Blues" (traditional, arranged by Grateful Dead)
"Beat It On Down the Line" (Jesse Fuller)
"Bird Song" (Garcia, Hunter)
"New Minglewood Blues" (traditional, arranged by Grateful Dead)
Disc 2
Second set:
"China Cat Sunflower" (Garcia, Hunter) →
"I Know You Rider" (traditional, arranged by Grateful Dead) →
"Samson and Delilah"  (traditional, arranged by Grateful Dead)
"Ship of Fools" (Garcia, Hunter)
Disc 3
"Estimated Prophet" (Weir, Barlow) →
"Uncle John's Band" (Garcia, Hunter) →
"Drums" (Mickey Hart, Bill Kreutzmann) →
"Space" (Garcia, Phil Lesh, Weir) →
"The Other One" (Weir, Kreutzmann) →
"Stella Blue" (Garcia, Hunter) →
"Good Lovin'" (Rudy Clark, Arthur Resnick)
Encore:
"U.S. Blues" (Garcia, Hunter)

March 10, 1981 
Disc 4
First set:
"Mississippi Half-Step Uptown Toodeloo" (Garcia, Hunter) →
"Franklin’s Tower" (Garcia, Kreutzmann, Hunter) →
"Me and My Uncle" (John Phillips)
"It Must Have Been the Roses" (Hunter) →
"Little Red Rooster" (Willie Dixon)
"Don’t Ease Me In" (traditional, arranged by Grateful Dead)
"Lazy Lightning" (Weir, Barlow) →
"Supplication" (Weir, Barlow)
"Brown-Eyed Women" (Garcia, Hunter) →
"Looks Like Rain" (Weir, Barlow) →
"Deal" (Garcia, Hunter)
Disc 5
Second set:
"Scarlet Begonias" (Garcia, Hunter) →
"Fire on the Mountain" (Hart, Hunter) →
"Lost Sailor" (Weir, Barlow) →
"Saint of Circumstance" (Weir, Barlow) →
"Jam" (Grateful Dead) →
"Drums" (Hart, Kreutzmann) →
Disc 6
"Space" (Garcia, Lesh, Weir) →
"The Wheel" (Garcia, Hunter) →
"China Doll" (Garcia, Hunter) →
"Truckin'" (Garcia, Lesh, Weir, Hunter) →
"Sugar Magnolia" (Weir, Hunter)
Encore:
"(I Can't Get No) Satisfaction" (Mick Jagger, Keith Richards) →
"Brokedown Palace" (Garcia, Hunter)

September 20, 1982 
Disc 7
First set:
"Shakedown Street" (Garcia, Hunter) →
"New Minglewood Blues" (traditional, arranged by Grateful Dead)
"Candyman" (Garcia, Hunter) →
"El Paso" (Robbins)
"Dupree's Diamond Blues" (Garcia, Hunter)
"It's All Over Now" (Bobby Womack, Shirley Womack)
"Never Trust a Woman" (Brent Mydland)
"Row Jimmy" (Garcia, Hunter)
"Throwing Stones" (Weir, Barlow) →
"Keep Your Day Job" (Garcia, Hunter)
Disc 8
Second set:
"Scarlet Begonias" (Garcia, Hunter) →
"Fire On The Mountain" (Hart, Hunter)
"Man Smart (Woman Smarter)" (Norman Span)
Disc 9
"Terrapin Station" (Garcia, Hunter) →
"Drums" (Hart, Kreutzmann) →
"Space" (Garcia, Lesh, Weir) →
"Spanish Jam" (Grateful Dead) →
"Truckin'" (Garcia, Lesh, Weir, Hunter) →
"The Other One" (Weir, Kreutzmann) →
"Stella Blue" (Garcia, Hunter) →
"Sugar Magnolia" (Weir, Hunter)
Encore:
"Touch of Grey" (Garcia, Hunter)

September 21, 1982 
Disc 10
First set:
"Playing in the Band" (Weir, Hart, Hunter) →
"Crazy Fingers" (Garcia, Hunter) →
"Me and My Uncle" (Phillips) →
"Big River" (Johnny Cash)
"West L.A. Fadeaway" (Garcia, Hunter)
"Beat It On Down the Line" (Fuller)
"Loser" (Garcia, Hunter)
"Looks Like Rain" (Weir, Barlow)
"China Cat Sunflower" (Garcia, Hunter) →
"I Know You Rider" (traditional, arranged by Grateful Dead)
Disc 11
Second set:
"Touch of Grey" (Garcia, Hunter) →
"Samson and Delilah" (traditional, arranged by Grateful Dead)
"High Time" (Garcia, Hunter)
Disc 12
"Estimated Prophet" (Weir, Barlow) →
"He's Gone" (Garcia, Hunter) →
"Drums" (Hart, Kreutzmann) →
"Space" (Garcia, Lesh, Weir) →
"Throwing Stones" (Weir, Barlow) →
"Not Fade Away" (Charles Hardin, Norman Petty) →
"Black Peter" (Garcia, Hunter) →
"Good Lovin'" (Clark, Resnick)
Encore:
"U.S. Blues" (Garcia, Hunter)

October 11, 1983 
Disc 13
First set:
"Wang Dang Doodle" (Dixon) →
"Jack Straw" (Weir, Hunter)
"Loser" (Garcia, Hunter)
"Me and My Uncle" (Phillips) →
"Mexicali Blues" (Weir, Barlow)
"Bird Song" (Garcia, Hunter)
"Hell in a Bucket" (Weir, Barlow, Mydland) →
"Keep Your Day Job" (Garcia, Hunter)
Second set:
"China Cat Sunflower" (Garcia, Hunter) →
"I Know You Rider" (traditional, arranged by Grateful Dead)
Disc 14
"I Need a Miracle" (Weir, Barlow) →
"Bertha" (Garcia, Hunter) →
"Jam" (Grateful Dead) →
"China Doll" (Garcia, Hunter) →
"Drums" (Hart, Kreutzmann) →
"Space" (Garcia, Lesh, Weir) →
"St. Stephen" (Garcia, Lesh, Hunter) →
"Throwing Stones" (Weir, Barlow) →
"Touch of Grey" (Garcia, Hunter)
Encore:
"Johnny B. Goode" (Chuck Berry)

October 12, 1983 
Disc 15
First set:
"Cold Rain and Snow" (traditional, arranged by Grateful Dead)
"New Minglewood Blues" (traditional, arranged by Grateful Dead)
"Ramble On Rose" (Garcia, Hunter)
"My Brother Esau" (Weir, Barlow)
"It Must Have Been the Roses" (Hunter)
"Cassidy" (Weir, Barlow) →
"Cumberland Blues" (Garcia, Lesh, Hunter)
"Looks Like Rain" (Weir, Barlow) →
"Might as Well" (Garcia, Hunter)
Disc 16
Second set:
"Help on the Way" (Garcia, Hunter) →
"Slipknot!" (Garcia, Keith Godchaux, Kreutzmann, Lesh, Weir) →
"Franklin's Tower" (Garcia, Hunter)
"Man Smart (Woman Smarter)" (Span)
Disc 17
"He's Gone" (Garcia, Hunter) →
"Drums" (Hart, Kreutzmann) →
"Space" (Garcia, Lesh, Weir) →
"Truckin'" (Garcia, Lesh, Weir, Hunter) →
"Black Peter" (Garcia, Hunter) →
"Not Fade Away" (Hardin, Petty)
Encore:
"Revolution" (John Lennon, Paul McCartney)

Personnel 
Grateful Dead
Jerry Garcia – guitar, vocals
Mickey Hart – drums
Bill Kreutzmann – drums
Phil Lesh – bass
Brent Mydland – keyboards, vocals
Bob Weir – guitar, vocals
Production
Produced by Grateful Dead
Produced for release by David Lemieux
Mastering: Jeffrey Norman
Recording: Dan Healy
Art direction: Dave Van Patten, Lisa Glines, Doran Tyson
Original art: Dave Van Patten
Design: Lisa Glines
Liner notes: David Fricke

Charts

References 

Grateful Dead live albums
Rhino Records live albums
2022 live albums